Leinonen is a Finnish surname. Notable people with the surname include:

 Artturi Leinonen (1888–1963), Finnish journalist, writer and politician
 Eeva Leinonen (born 1958), Finnish academic and head of Australian and Irish universities
 Jani Leinonen (born 1978), Finnish artist
 Kaarlo Leinonen (1914–1975), Finnish general and Minister of Defence
 Kimmo Leinonen (born 1949), Finnish ice hockey executive and writer
 Mikko Leinonen (born 1955), Finnish ice hockey player
 Sanni Leinonen (born 1989), Finnish alpine skier
 Tero Leinonen (born 1975), Finnish ice hockey goaltender
 Ville Leinonen (born 1975), Finnish singer and songwriter

Finnish-language surnames